Lloyd Williams (born 15 May 1939) is a Jamaican cricketer. He played in one first-class match for the Jamaican cricket team in 1957/58.

See also
 List of Jamaican representative cricketers

References

External links
 

1939 births
Living people
Jamaican cricketers
Jamaica cricketers
People from Westmoreland Parish